Hemigrammocypris rasborella, the golden venus chub, is a species of cyprinid fish endemic to the islands of Honshu, Shikoku and Kyushu in Japan. It is found widely in lowland habitats, including ditches and ponds. It is listed as endangered on the Japanese Red List. H. rasborella is the only species in its genus, but there are significant genetic differences between some populations, comparable to those generally seen between closely related species. It is a short-lived species that typically reaches an age of about one year. It is listed as endangered in the Red List of Threatened Fishes of Japan.

References

External links

Cyprinid fish of Asia
Freshwater fish of Japan
Taxa named by Henry Weed Fowler
Fish described in 1910